Baraan may refer to:
 Baraan-e Jonubi Rural District
 Baraan-e Shomali Rural District